Hafodyrynys Platform railway station was a station on the former Taff Vale Extension of the Newport, Abergavenny and Hereford Railway. It served the village of Hafodyrynys, and was located near to the western portal of the 280 yd Glyn Tunnel.

References

Disused railway stations in Caerphilly County Borough
Former Great Western Railway stations
Railway stations in Great Britain opened in 1913
Railway stations in Great Britain closed in 1964
1913 establishments in Wales
1964 disestablishments in Wales